The Sidney Lanier Bridge is a cable-stayed bridge that spans the Brunswick River in Brunswick, Georgia, carrying four lanes of U.S. Route 17. The current bridge was built as a replacement to the original vertical-lift bridge, which was twice struck by ships. It was named for poet Sidney Lanier. Each year (usually in February), there is the "Bridge Run" sponsored by Southeast Georgia Health System when the south side of the bridge is closed to traffic and people register to run (or walk) the bridge.

The bridge hosts the WX4BWK amateur radio repeater on the top of one of its pillars.

History
The original Sidney Lanier Bridge was opened June 22, 1956, and was built by Sverdrup & Parcel, the same firm that designed the I-35W Mississippi River bridge which collapsed in 2007. On November 7, 1972 the ship African Neptune struck the bridge, causing parts of the bridge to collapse and causing several cars to fall into the water. Ten deaths were caused by the accident. On May 3, 1987 the bridge was again struck by a ship, this time by the Polish freighter Ziemia Bialostocka.

Scenes from the original version of The Longest Yard were filmed on the first Sidney Lanier Bridge. The raising of the lift span was used by Burt Reynolds' character to escape the police.

Comparison with two other bridges
The proximity and rivalry between Charleston, South Carolina, Savannah and Brunswick often led to comparisons between the Arthur Ravenel Jr. Bridge, the Talmadge Memorial Bridge, and the Sidney Lanier Bridge. Completed in 2005, the clearance under the Arthur Ravenel Jr. Bridge is actually only one foot higher than that of both the Talmadge Memorial Bridge and the Sidney Lanier Bridge. Unlike the Talmadge Memorial Bridge and the Sidney Lanier Bridge, however, the Ravenel Bridge has eight travel lanes; the Talmadge and the Sidney both have just four lanes. The Ravenel also features a dedicated bike/pedestrian lane.

Superlatives
Until the 2003 completion of the Sidney Lanier Bridge, the Dames Point Bridge in Jacksonville, Florida was the only bridge in the United States to feature the harp stay arrangement.

Photos

See also

Great Belt Fixed Link
List of bridges documented by the Historic American Engineering Record in Georgia (U.S. state)

References

External links

Findley McNary Engineering profile
Brunswick Bridge photos, aerial photos of the Sidney Lanier Bridge, 2001 (under construction) and 2004 (complete)
 of previous bridge

Cable-stayed bridges in the United States
Bridge disasters in the United States
Bridge disasters caused by collision
Bridges completed in 1956
Bridges completed in 2003
Buildings and structures in Glynn County, Georgia
Historic American Engineering Record in Georgia (U.S. state)
Landmarks in Georgia (U.S. state)
Road bridges in Georgia (U.S. state)
Transportation in Glynn County, Georgia
U.S. Route 17
Bridges of the United States Numbered Highway System
1972 disasters in the United States
1987 disasters in the United States
Transportation disasters in Georgia (U.S. state)